Greenfield Township is one of the fifteen townships of Gallia County, Ohio, United States. As of the 2010 census the population was 495.

Geography
Located in the far western part of the county, it borders the following townships:
Madison Township, Jackson County - north
Perry Township - east
Walnut Township - southeast
Symmes Township, Lawrence County - south
Washington Township, Lawrence County - west
Jefferson Township, Jackson County - northwest

It is the most westerly township in the county.

No municipalities are located in Greenfield Township.

Name and history
Statewide, other Greenfield Townships are located in Fairfield and Huron Counties.

Government
The township is governed by a three-member board of trustees, who are elected in November of odd-numbered years to a four-year term beginning on the following January 1. Two are elected in the year after the presidential election and one is elected in the year before it. There is also an elected township fiscal officer, who serves a four-year term beginning on April 1 of the year after the election, which is held in November of the year before the presidential election. Vacancies in the fiscal officership or on the board of trustees are filled by the remaining trustees.

References

External links
County website

Townships in Gallia County, Ohio
Townships in Ohio